The United States Navy Memorial is a memorial in Washington, D.C. honoring those who have served or are currently serving in the Navy, Marine Corps, Coast Guard, and the Merchant Marine.

It lies on Pennsylvania Avenue NW between 7th Street Northwest and 9th Street Northwest, adjacent to the Archives station of the Washington Metro and the National Archives building. The National Park Service, through its National Mall and Memorial Parks administrative unit, provides technical and maintenance assistance to the foundation. The plaza is part of Pennsylvania Avenue National Historic Site.

Associated with the memorial is the Naval Heritage Center, which offers spaces available for rent, and is open year-round.

History
In the early days of U.S. independence, architect Pierre L'Enfant envisioned a memorial in the nation's capital "to celebrate the first rise of the Navy and consecrate its progress and achievements."

Pennsylvania Avenue, the boulevard that links the U.S. Capitol and White House, was chosen as the site for a memorial to all of the U.S. sea services.

After President John F. Kennedy—himself a World War II Navy war hero—inspired the redevelopment of Pennsylvania Avenue, another, Admiral Arleigh Burke, proclaimed in 1977 that "we have talked long enough about a navy memorial and it's time we did something about it."

In the spring of 1977, Burke—a former three-term Chief of Naval Operations—started to recruit a group to form the private, non-profit U.S. Navy Memorial Foundation. The following year, the foundation, led by Rear Admiral William Thompson, USN (Ret.), began work on the enabling legislation, design, site selection, and fund raising that would lead to the construction and subsequent of a memorial.

Congress authorized the memorial in 1980, with the stipulation that funding come solely from private contributions. In March 1980, President Jimmy Carter signed the act into law.

The foundation teamed up with the Pennsylvania Avenue Development Corporation to use Market Square as the site for the memorial. The pair selected William Conklin and James Rossant of New York as architects.

By December 1985, the foundation had raised enough funds to earn a go-ahead from the Secretary of the Interior and construction got underway the following month.

By August 1987, Stanley Bleifeld completed work on The Lone Sailor statue as construction of the memorial neared completion at the site.  The memorial was dedicated on October 13, 1987.

From late 1987 to mid-1990, two buildings were constructed on the memorial's northern perimeter. The eastern of the two buildings was selected for the memorial's visitor center. The building's shell was sufficiently completed by September 1989 to allow construction to begin for the interior of the Visitors Center. The visitor center opened in June 1991 and was formally dedicated on October 12, 1991. Some $18-million was raised by opening day of the visitor center, and fund raising continues today, to retire remaining construction debt and support educational programs undertaken by the foundation.

During the summer of 2006, the water in the fountains of the Navy Memorial was colored blue due by chemicals added to fight algae growth. According to a spokesperson for the memorial, the algae has been surprisingly difficult to eliminate, and that they "figured it was better to have blue water than to have an algae-encrusted memorial." The blue water was gone by the end of the summer.

Memorial Plaza features The Lone Sailor, a statue by Stanly Bleifield and tribute to all personnel of the sea services overlooking the Granite Sea, a map depicting the world's oceans, using an azimuthal projection centered on Washington, DC. Surrounding these are two fountains honoring the personnel of the American Navy and the other navies of the world. Its southern hemisphere is surrounded by 26 bronze high reliefs commemorating events, personnel, and communities of the various sea services.

Adjacent to the Memorial Plaza is the United States Navy Memorial Visitor Center, which features the Arleigh & Roberta Burke Theater, several rotating exhibits about the sea services, and several Navy Log kiosks, for easy registration on the Navy Log. The Visitor Center also features daily screenings of the films At Sea and A Day in the Life of the Blue Angels. The Media Resource Center provides a library of printed, audio and video historical documents on the Navy. The Navy Log room has touch-screen kiosks to register and search for Sea Service members and veterans.

From June 2018 through June 2020, the Visitor Center featured two exhibits: The American Sailor: Agile, Capable, and Talented, and Zumwalt: The Current that Brought the Navy to the Shores of the 20th Century. The American Sailor tells the story of the birth of the United States Navy, and explores how individuals have defended the country at sea and provided U.S. military services wherever the seas extend over time. Zumwalt exhibits oral histories, personal keepsakes, family artifacts and first-hand written accounts of Zumwalt’ s life as CNO, leader, father, husband, and true American that propelled the Navy into the 20th century.Navy Log
The Navy Log is a repository of sea service personnel, which includes information on their military service. The Navy Log is also available online at the Navy Memorial website.

Memorial quotes
On an outdoor wall at the Navy Memorial are engraved noteworthy sayings from the history of the US Navy, and who said them. Among which are:
"I have not yet begun to fight!" – Captain John Paul Jones – 1779
"Don't give up the ship!" – Captain James Lawrence – 1813
"We have met the enemy and they are ours." – Commodore Oliver Hazard Perry – 1813
"Damn the torpedoes, full steam ahead." – Admiral David Farragut – 1864
"You may fire when you are ready, Gridley." – Commodore George Dewey – 1898
"Speak softly and carry a big stick." – President Theodore Roosevelt – 1907
"Sighted sub, sank same" – Aviation Machinist's Mate 1/c Donald Francis Mason – 1942
"Underway on nuclear power." – Commander Eugene P. Wilkinson – January 17, 1955
"That's one small step for (a) man, one giant leap for mankind" – Astronaut and Naval Aviator Neil Armstrong – July 20, 1969
"I can imagine no more rewarding a career. And any man who may be asked in this century what he did to make his life worthwhile, I think can respond with a good deal of pride and satisfaction: 'I served in the United States Navy.'" President John F. Kennedy, 1 August 1963, at Bancroft Hall at the US Naval Academy

Other Navy memorials

Navy-Merchant Marine Memorial
Peace Monument (Naval Monument)
John Ericsson National Memorial
John Paul Jones Memorial
National Memorial Cemetery of the Pacific
Perry's Victory and International Peace Memorial
Port Chicago Naval Magazine National Memorial
Various buildings and memorials on the campus of the U.S. Naval Academy
USS Arizona Memorial (BB-39)
USS Bennington Monument
USS Indianapolis National Memorial
USS Maine memorials
USS South Dakota (BB-57)
USS Utah Memorial (BB-31)
Battleship Missouri Memorial – USS Missouri (BB-63)
Battleship New Jersey Museum and Memorial – USS New Jersey'' (BB-62)
U.S. submarines designated as memorials
World War II Submarine Torpedo monument
UDT-SEAL Memorial
Seabees Memorial
Various memorials for Lt. Vincent R. Capodanno
Lt. Hans Grauert Memorial Field
Ensign C. Markland Kelly Jr. Award
Lt. Donald McLaughlin Jr. Award
YF-415 Memorial, Hingham, Massachusetts

See also
List of public art in Washington, D.C., Ward 6
United States Marine Corps War Memorial
Michigan Soldiers' and Sailors' Monument
U.S. Navy Museum
American War Memorials

References

External links

United States Navy Memorial official website
National Mall & Memorial Parks
Complete photos of the Navy Memorial. Sites of Memory website
U.S. Navy Memorial. James Rossant website

1987 establishments in Washington, D.C.
Monuments and memorials in Washington, D.C.
Mem
Navy Mem
Navy Mem
Navy Mem
Outdoor sculptures in Washington, D.C.
Buildings and structures completed in 1987
Naval monuments and memorials
Penn Quarter
Fountains in Washington, D.C.